Tadman is a surname. Notable people with the surname include:

D. H. Tadman, British army officer
George Tadman (1914–1994), British footballer
Maurice Tadman (1921–1994), British footballer, brother of George

See also
Tasman (name)

Surnames of Old English origin